Makkari, formerly known as Hurricane and Mercury, is a character appearing in American comic books published by Marvel Comics. Created by Martin A. Burnstein and Jack Kirby, the character first appeared as Makkari in The Eternals #5 (November 1976), but through retroactive continuity was later established as also having been Mercury in Red Raven Comics #1 (August 1940). He is a member of the Eternals, a race of superhumans in the Marvel Universe. He was also a member of the First Line and Monster Hunters.

Lauren Ridloff portrays a deaf female version of Makkari in the Marvel Cinematic Universe, debuting in Eternals (2021).

Publication history
Originally, Makkari was a character in Jack Kirby's The Eternals. Mark Gruenwald later reintroduced Makkari as a long-running supporting character in the Quasar series.

Hurricane reappears as a member of the Monster Hunters in Marvel Universe #4 (September 1998), in a story set in the 1950s. By the end of this three-issue story, it turns out the monsters they are hunting are actually Deviants and Hurricane is revealed to be Makkari. Marvel Comics continuity was later retconned so that the character presented as the mythological god Mercury, introduced in Red Raven Comics #1 (August 1940; "Mercury in the 20th Century" by artist Kirby and writer Martin A. Bursten, pen name "Burstein"), was actually Makkari. Mercury was only seen in that single story, in which he worked to thwart the machinations of Pluto.

Makkari is featured as one of the main characters in the Marvel limited series Eternals (2006–07), written by Neil Gaiman and penciled by artist John Romita Jr.

Fictional character biography
Makkari is the son of Verona and Mara, born in Olympia, the capital city of the Eternals of Earth. He is a member of the Eternals' Technologist's Guild and is skilled at designing and building high-speed vehicles. Makkari has involved himself in Earth's affairs more often than most Eternals. Under the name Thoth, he taught writing to the Egyptians. He was taught philosophy by Plato. He rescued Sersi from Nero's Fire. He spent some time as the charioteer of Darius I of Persia. He witnessed the Trojan War, the reign of Vlad the Impaler, and the Alamo.

In the 1940s, he worked on Earth, per Zuras' request, under the aliases "Hurricane" and "Mercury" (an example of retcon, these Golden Age characters were not originally supposed to be related), and fought Warlord Kro and Deviant Mutates alongside the Monster Hunters, a team he formed using his identity as National Security Agent Jake Curtiss. Later on, he taught Elvis Presley a few guitar tricks. Following the disbanding of the Monster Hunters, Makkari was convinced by Pixie to join the First Line as "Major Mercury".{{efn|Between Marvel: The Lost Generation #4 and Marvel: The Lost Generation #5}} He and First Line fought against the original Skrull invasion of Earth, and, along with Yeti and Pixie, was one of the few members of First Line to survive the conflict.

Makkari accompanied Thena to New York City to help rescue Sersi and repulse the Deviant invasion. He was with the Eternals who introduced themselves to the students at City College during the Fourth Host of the Celestials. He then returned to Olympia with Ikaris and Margo Damian, where he encountered Sprite. He also participated in the Uni-Mind ritual. Alongside Ikaris and Sersi, he battled the Hulk robot. Makkari then battled Ikaris, who was under the mental influence of Dromedan.

Makkari later battled Hermes of Olympus. He battled Maelstrom alongside the Avengers. Makkari elected to remain while the majority of Eternals departed Earth. Makkari accompanied Ikaris on his mission to assemble the Eternals to wage war against the Deviants. Makkari then encountered Lord Ghaur. Makkari accompanied the other Eternals to Lemuria to battle the Deviants. Makkari battled Ghaur alongside the Eternals, Thor, and the West Coast Avengers, and participated in the defeat of Ghaur. Some time later, alongside the Eternals, Makkari fought the Super-Skrull and encountered the Silver Surfer.

Makkari was later rescued by Quasar when he began running rampant, literally. He revealed that he had traded his other Eternal abilities for greater speed and endurance. He became friends with Quasar when he enlisted Quasar to go to Lemuria to help him save Master Elo, who was tutoring Makkari in how to channel his cosmic energy into more speed. He then accompanied Quasar to the Stranger's laboratory world. There, he encountered the Star-Dancer, and battled Trikon and the Whizzer. Makkari later worked in Quasar's office under the alias "Mike Khary." He participated in a marathon to the Moon sponsored by the Runner, one of the Elders of the Universe, and nearly won; he bested Quicksilver, Captain Marvel, Whizzer, Speed Demon, Black Racer, and Super Sabre, only to lose the race in the last moments by an amnesiac, dimensions-spanning human being. Makkari then became Quasar's roommate. He was killed when his heart was stopped by Maelstrom, but returned to life, as part of an agreement struck between Eternity, Death, Infinity and Oblivion. Maelstrom later attempted to seize more power by draining the kinetic energy from Makkari, but Maelstrom was ultimately defeated by the other Eternals. However, he soon found he had become so fast that he could no longer move in synch with the rest of the universe.

In the 2006 Eternals limited series, the Eternals are the victims of memory and reality manipulation by Sprite, and have thus forgotten their true identities. Makkari believes himself to be a medicine student named Mark Curry, and is the first Eternal shown in the series. He meets Ikaris, and causes his capture by the Deviants. By issues #2 and #3, he finally begins to experience his powers of super-speed, and uses them to stop terrorists from attacking a party. However, after telling him what has happened Sprite tricks Curry into opening a passageway to the long-dormant Celestial underneath San Francisco, and in doing so incapacitates Curry. During this time the Dreaming Celestial and Makkari began to talk in his dreams, firstly in the form of Sersi, and told him that it personally made him. By the end of the series he has become the Dreaming Celestial's prophet.

Later when the Celestials' Final Host arrived on Earth, Makkari along with all the Eternals killed themselves after realizing the true purpose for which they were created.

In the 2021 Eternals series, Makkari was resurrected as a woman of color.

Powers and abilities
Makkari is a member of the race of superhumans known as Eternals. He possesses superhuman strength, speed, and reflexes. He can create cyclones by running in circles, and can run up walls and across water. Makkari's body eventually accumulates fatigue poisons and is susceptible to injury.

Although in most of his appearances Makkari has the typical powers of an Eternal, his obsession with speed, starting in the Quasar series, causes him to focus most of his body's Cosmic Energy on enhancing his running speed. As a result, he lost his ability to fly and many of his other powers were weakened in the process. Makkari possesses none of the psionic powers of the average Eternal (levitation, ocular force projection, and molecular rearrangement), having purposefully readapted all his specialized cell enclaves to speed and running-related attributes. At present, he can run at near light speed for extended periods, but his physical strength (while still far greater than human) has been reduced by half, and he seemingly cannot project energy or manipulate matter.

Makkari sometimes wears a protective crash helmet, though he does not truly need it. He wears synthetic stretch fabric, specially treated to resist the rigors of high velocity movement.

Makkari has great mechanical aptitude, and the ability to pilot most land and air vehicles. He has moderate experience at hand-to-hand combat; his fighting style incorporates his superhuman speed. He has finished the standard Eternal higher education, and underwent special tutoring in the applications of speed.

 Reception 

 Accolades 

 In 2016, Screen Rant ranked Makkari 3rd in their "12 Fastest Superheroes Of All Time" list.
 In 2018, CBR.com ranked Makkar 2nd in their "25 Fastest Characters In The Marvel Universe" list.
 In 2019, CBR.com ranked Makkari 7th in their "15 Most Powerful Eternals" list.
 In 2021, Screen Rant ranked Makkari 6th in their "10 Most Powerful Members Of The Eternals" list.
 In 2021, CBR.com ranked Makkari 6th in their "10 Strongest Characters From Eternals Comics" list.
 In 2022, Sportskeeda ranked Makkari 5th in their "5 fastest characters in comic history" list.
 In 2022, Collider included Makkari in their "Top 5 Fastest Superheroes" list.
 In 2022, CBR.com ranked Makkari 4th in their "Marvel: The 20 Fastest Speedsters" list.

In other media
Television

 Makkari appears in Marvel Knights: Eternals, voiced by Sebastian Spence.

Film

 Makkari appears in Eternals, portrayed by Lauren Ridloff. This version of the character is a woman of color as well as deaf. Makkari is shown to have lived on her ship the Domo for years and it is implied that she is in a relationship with Druig. Makkari rejoined the team to stop Tiamut and prevent the destruction of planet Earth. Makkari and the team confronted Ikaris and Sprite to stop Tiamut. Makkari merged with the others to form the Uni-Mind and petrified Tiamut. Makkari, Druig, and Thena traveled in the Domo to seek out more Eternals to tell them the truth. Upon discovering that Sersi, Phastos, and Kingo had been captured by Arishem (who intends to study their memories to see if humanity is worthy enough to live) during the mid-credits, the trio allied with Eros and Pip Gofern to save them.

Video games

 Makkari appears as an unlockable playable character in Marvel Future Fight''.

Notes

References

External links
 Makkari at the Marvel Universe
 
 

Characters created by Jack Kirby
Comics characters introduced in 1940
Comics characters introduced in 1941
Comics characters introduced in 1976
Eternals (comics)
Fictional characters with superhuman durability or invulnerability
Golden Age superheroes
Marvel Comics characters who can move at superhuman speeds
Marvel Comics characters who can teleport
Marvel Comics characters with accelerated healing
Marvel Comics characters with superhuman strength
Marvel Comics superheroes
Timely Comics characters